Jose Roberto Alves  (born 13 October 1954) was a Brazilian football player.

Club career 
He mainly played for clubs in Brazil. He also played for Pohang Steelers of the South Korean K League, then known as the POSCO Dolphins.

He was first foreign player of K League with Sergio Luis Cogo.

He only appeared in K League (5 matches)

References

External links

1954 births
Living people
Association football midfielders
Brazilian footballers
Brazilian expatriate footballers
Pohang Steelers players
Chinese Super League players
K League 1 players